The norm of reciprocity requires that we repay in kind what another has done for us. It can be understood as the expectation that people will respond favorably to each other by returning benefits for benefits, and responding with either indifference or hostility to harms. The social norm of reciprocity often takes different forms in different areas of social life, or in different societies.  All of them, however, are distinct from related ideas such as gratitude, the Golden Rule, or mutual goodwill. See reciprocity (social and political philosophy) for an analysis of the concepts involved.

The norm of reciprocity mirrors the concept of reciprocal altruism in evolutionary biology. However, evolutionary theory and therefore sociobiology was not well received by mainstream psychologists. This led to the revitalisation of reciprocal altruism underneath the new social psychological concept, norm of reciprocity. Reciprocal altruism has been applied to various species, including humans, while mainstream psychologists use the norm of reciprocity to only explain humans.

An underlying norm of reciprocity is by itself a powerful engine for motivating, creating, sustaining, and regulating the cooperative behavior required for self-sustaining social organizations, controlling the damage done by the unscrupulous, and contributing to social system stability. See the discussions in tit for tat and reciprocity (social psychology). The power and ubiquity of the norm of reciprocity can be used against the unwary, however, and is the basis for the success of many malicious confidence games. Minor, usually less malicious examples are techniques used in advertising and other propaganda whereby a small gift of some kind is proffered with the expectation of producing a desire on the part of the recipient to reciprocate in some way, for example by purchasing a product, making a donation, or becoming more receptive to a line of argument.

For some legal scholars, reciprocity underpins in general the international law "and the law of war specifically". Until well after World War II ended in 1945, the norm of reciprocity provided a justification for conduct in armed conflict. British jurist Hersch Lauterpacht noted in 1953 that "it is impossible to visualize the conduct of hostilities in which one side would be bound by rules of warfare without benefiting from them and the other side would benefit from rules of warfare without being bound by them."

Positive and negative
Two key elements of the norm of reciprocity are positive and negative aspects to the term.

A positive norm of reciprocity is "the embedded obligations created by exchanges of benefits or favours among individuals. The recipient feels indebted to the favour or benefit giver until he/she repays" (Chen, 2009). The positive reciprocity norm is a common social expectation where a person who helps another person can expect positive feedback whether it's in the form of a gift, a compliment, a loan, a job reference, etc. In social psychology, positive reciprocity refers to responding to a positive action with another positive action (rewarding kind actions). This norm is so powerful, it allows the initial giver to ask for something in return for what was given rather than having to wait for a voluntary reciprocal act. In some cases, a person does not have to ask for the other person to return a favour because it's already implied. Reciprocity also works at the level of liking; We like people who help us, and dislike those who ask for help but never return it. Disapproval is often enough to make people comply with norm of reciprocity.

"A negative norm of reciprocity represents the means by which individuals act against unfavourable treatments, and functions to keep balance in social systems" (Chen, 2009). In contrast to the positive reciprocity norm', the negative reciprocity norm emphasizes the return of unfavourable treatment as an appropriate response to a misdeed. The principle of this norm serves as a powerful deterrent for violent or symbolic mistreatment in society. Harming others invites anger and revenge, therefore people receiving negative treatment are likely to retaliate in an angry manner. Studies have shown, that individuals with a propensity towards anger might more strongly endorse the negative reciprocity norm as a justification for consummating their hostility by punishing the instigator of mistreatment (Eisenberger, Lynch, Aselage and Rohdiek 2004). Carlsmith, Darley, and Robinson (2002) found that most college students believe that criminal punishment should be determined by the seriousness of the crime rather than by punishment's effectiveness in preventing similar crimes.

There are also contrasting ideas when it comes to the differentiation of negative and positive norms of reciprocity. "In contrast to a positive norm of reciprocity Gouldner (1960) also suggested a negative norm of reciprocity or sentiments of retaliation where the emphasis is placed not on the return of benefits but on the return of injuries" (Chen, 2009). So there is a slight grey line between what could be considered a positive norm and a negative norm. But both of these reciprocity norms are mechanisms adapted by humans in order to keep a balance among mankind. "Accordingly, both positive and negative norms or reciprocity serve as starting mechanisms as well as stabilizing functions in theta they help initiate and maintain equitable interpersonal exchanges in human evolution" (Chen, 2009).

Private and public

Private reciprocation 
The norm of reciprocity is usually internalised. All major ethical and religious traditions include reciprocity as a primary rule of moral behaviour – from Jesus (“As you would that men should do to you, do ye also to them likewise.” to Confucius (“What you do not want done to yourself, do not do to others.”). The moral character of the norm may encourage the sense that following it is an imperative rather than a choice, and failing to reciprocate should create feelings of self-reproach and guilt.

Public reciprocation 
Another way to understand how the norm of reciprocity works is to understand that the initial favour and the following repayment always unfolds in a public way. The social rewards of sticking to the norm and the costs of breaching it are profound. People deny continued group membership to others who conveniently breach the norm.

The norm of reciprocity stipulates that the amount of the return to a favour is “roughly the same” as what had been received. Such idea of equivalence takes two forms;
 Heteromorphic reciprocity: Things exchanged can be totally different, but they are equal in value, as defined by the stakeholders in the situation.
 Homeomorphic reciprocity: Exchanges are identical in form, either with regard to the things exchanged or to the situations under which they are exchanged. Historically, the most significant expression of homeomorphic reciprocity is in the negative reciprocity norms; in retaliation, the focus is not on the return of benefits, but on the return of injuries.

However, Mark A. Whatley and colleagues (1999) found that people will give more favors, like a higher donation, if it is a public condition.

Significance to social system stability
Favours given are not immediately repaid and returning of favours may take a long time. Such intervening time period is governed by the norm of reciprocity in two manners. First, the stakeholder is assembling, mobilizing, liquidating resources or assets so as to make a suitable repayment. Second, it is a time period that the relevant party should not do harm to people who have given them benefits; people are morally constrained to demonstrate gratitude towards or maintain peace with their benefactors. As such, outstanding obligations can thus contribute to the stabilising of social systems by encouraging mutually beneficial exchange and cooperative behaviours.

The only "rough equivalence" of repayment aforementioned then suggests an important system-stabilising function. It introduces an element of ambiguity as to whether the indebtedness has been repaid fully, thus creating uncertainty on who the indebted parties are. The comparative indeterminancy then serves as a type of all-purpose moral cement; it keeps us mindful of our behaviours and induces cooperative action.

The norm of reciprocity also contributes to social stability even when there is a well-developed system of specific status duties; status duties shape behavior as the status occupant believe them binding in their own right; they are expected to faithfully fulfill their responsibilities. Nonetheless, the general norm of reciprocity offers another source of motivation and moral sanction for conforming with specific status obligations; if other people have been fulfilling their status responsibilities to you, you then have a second-order obligation to fulfill your status responsibilities to them as well. The feeling of gratitude reinforces that of rectitude and contributes to conformity, thus social stability.

In organizational research
Perceived organizational support (POS) and perceived psychological contract violation (PPCV) are the two most common measures of the reciprocity norm in organizational research. POS is the degree to which employees’ believe that their organization values their contributions and cares about their well-being. POS is generally thought to be the organization’s contribution to a positive reciprocity dynamic with employees, as employees tend to perform better to pay back POS.  PPCV is a construct that regards employees’ feelings of disappointment (ranging from minor frustration to betrayal) arising from their belief that their organization has broken its work-related promises, is generally thought to be the organization’s contribution to a negative reciprocity dynamic, as employees tend to perform more poorly to pay back PPCV.

David R. Hekman and colleagues found that professional employees, such as doctors and lawyers, are most likely to repay POS with better performance when they have high levels of organizational identification combined with low levels of professional identification. Professional employees are most forgiving of PPCV when they have high levels of organizational identification combined with low levels of professional identification.

The norms of reciprocity in interactions among employees underlie Adam Grant's distinction between "giver cultures" and "taker cultures" as two end-points of a scale, with "matcher cultures" in between.

In evolutionary psychology

Evolutionary psychologists have used the norm of reciprocity to explain altruism by emphasizing our expectations that “helping others will increase the likelihood that they will help us in the future.” The underlying justification lies in the human desire to reciprocate kindness and cooperate for survival value has enabled our continued existence in a hostile world. Thus, the norm of reciprocity ultimately has survival value. Furthermore, being as this sentiment is intrinsic to our evolutionary history and existence, adherence to the norm would constitute “natural” behavior whose neglect might necessarily cause a degree of dissonance in an individual who, among many other self-concepts, consciously labels himself a human being, perhaps leading to a reduction in self-esteem. The norm of reciprocity is reciprocal altruism, a concept coined by the evolutionary biologist Robert Trivers. However, the rise of sociobiology was not well received by mainstream psychologists. It is therefore not surprising that the stigma of the evolutionary theory led reciprocal altruism to be revitalised underneath the name "norm of reciprocity". The norm of reciprocity is arguably less scientifically advanced than reciprocal altruism, due to the degree of research underneath the name "reciprocal altruism" as opposed to the name "norm of reciprocity".

In developmental psychology

Developmental psychologists have studied the norm of reciprocity and the development of this norm in children. Psychologists have found that children begin to show the reciprocal behavior around the age of two, when they observe the behavior of others and begin to have their own relationships with peers. One way that psychologists have been able to study the norm of reciprocity in children is by observing and experimenting on their toy sharing behaviour. Kristina R. Olson and Elizabeth S. Spelke (2007) conducted an experiment in which they used dolls to represent family members and friends and gave the child various items to distribute to the dolls after a series of situations were explained to the child. These situations represented private and public reciprocity and gave the child the choice of which dolls to share the items with. An example of a situation involves one of the dolls sharing with the rest of them. Olson and Spelke found that children will give to family and friends more than strangers, repay those who shared with them, and reward those who share with others, even if they do not receive the item.

Psychologists Ken J. Rotenberg and Luanne Mann have also explored the development of the reciprocity norm of self-disclosure and its functions in children’s attraction to peers. The findings have indicated that the norm of the reciprocity is involved in attraction to peers only by six-grade; children of this year group showed such effect by reporting greater affection towards others who reciprocated the same amount of intimacy than those whose intimacy level deviated from the initiator’s. According to Youniss's (1980) theory of social development, children's friendship during the early part of middle childhood (5–8 years) is based upon the reciprocity of behaviour that suggests a "tit-for-tat" rule of exchange and interaction. During the later part of middle childhood (9–11 years) and beyond, children's friendship is based on the reciprocity of behaviour that suggests a mutually cooperative principle of exchange as well as an appreciation of reciprocity.

Studies
A study was done in 2000 that consisted of 116 MBA students enrolled in a part-time MBA program at a business school, in the north east of the United States (Chen, 2009). The study consisted of two parts, the first part was to complete a series of self perception questions, which included the measure of the relational-self orientation (Chen, 2009). The second part was to complete a work relationship exercise during a class session 6 weeks later than the first task. "In the exercise, participants
read a vignette in which they were asked to imagine that they were the focal person in a reward allocation scenario at work" (Chen, 2009). They were then told that they worked hard on the project together with a colleague, and made the same sort of effort and contribution to the project. Their supervisor then agreed to give $1000 reward. They were then given the following options on how to divide the money: 
(A) Your colleague will make a proposal as to how the money should be divided.
(B) If you accept the proposal, then you will get what the colleague proposed to you. However, if you reject it, then the
money will return to the company for future reward considerations. 
Measures were calculated on how many people would reject the proposal or accept the proposal. And the results were positively and negatively skewed. If the two persons were close friends or colleagues the acceptance rate was 62% if the offer was 20% of the 1000 dollars, and 100% if the offer was 80% of the money (Chen, 2009). If the colleagues were distant then the rates were 20% for 20% of the money and 77% for 80% of the money (Chen, 2009).

See also

Notes

References

 Axelrod, Robert. The Evolution of Cooperation. Revised edition. New York: Basic Books, 2006.
 Becker, Lawrence C. (1986) Reciprocity. London and New York: Routledge. (Paperback,1990) Chicago: University of Chicago Press.
 
 Blau, Peter M. Exchange and Power in Social Life.  New York: John Wiley, 1964.  Reprinted, with a new introduction, New Brunswick: Transaction Books, 1986.
 Carlsmith, K.M., Darley, J.M., & Robinson, P.H. (2002). Why do we punish? Deterrence and the just deserts as motives for punishment. Journal of Personality and Social Psychology, 83, 284-299.
 Chen, Ya-Ru, Chen, Xiao-Ping, and Portnoy, Rebecca (2009). To whom do positive norm of reciprocity apply? Effects of inequitable offer, relationship and relational-self orientation. Journal of Experimental Social Psychology
 Cialdini, R. B. (1984) Influence. New York, NY: Morrow. .
 Eisenberger, Robert, Lynch, Patrick, Aselage, Justin, and Rohdieck, Stephanie. (2004). Who takes the most revenge? Individual differences in negative reciprocity norm endorsement. Personality and Social Psychology Bulletin, 30, 787-788.
 Gill, Christopher. Postlethwaite, Norman. Seaford, Richard (Eds.): Reciprocity in Ancient Greece. Oxford and New York: Oxford University Press 1998. .
 Pratkanis, A. & Aronson, E. (2001). The Age of Propaganda: The Everyday Use and Abuse of Persuasion. New York, NY: Owl Books. .

External links
 Norm of reciprocity
 Google Scholar: Norm of reciprocity

Advertising
Interpersonal relationships
Ethical principles
Concepts in ethics
Moral psychology